Theth National Park is a national park in northern Albania. The park was established to protect various ecosystems and biodiversity and the cultural and historical heritage of the region. It is dominated by high terrain, with a wide variety of natural features including valleys, rivers, mountains, waterfalls, dense forests and several rock formations. The International Union for Conservation of Nature  (IUCN) has listed the park as Category II. Notably, the region has been also identified as an important Bird and Plant Area. In 2017, Theth has been further declared a Protected Historic Center.

Theth village sprawls across the upper Shala Valley and is trapped on four sides by numerous two-thousanders such as Radohima in the west, Arapi and Poplluka in the north and Jezerca in the east. Like most of the Albanian Alps, the park is dominated by limestone and dolomite rocks and shows major karst features such as the Grunas Canyon and the southern wall of Arapi, which is considered the highest rock face in the Balkans.

Flora
Despite its limited area, the park is distinguished by a highly diverse flora with estimates which vary between 1500 and 1650 species of plants among which 70 species are endangered. Theth is part of a large preserved ecosystem all of which is primarily untouched with pristine quality. Biogeographically, the Dinaric Mountains mixed forests terrestrial ecoregion of the Palearctic temperate broadleaf and mixed forest biome occur in the park. There are three types of forest found at the park. The oak floor extends from an altitude between 600 metres up to 800 metres and is dominated, among other by austrian oak, oriental hornbeam, hophornbeam, cornel and flowering ash. The beech floor is mainly covered with common beech, silver fir and sycamore, between 900 metres and 1,900 metres. The alpine floor, lying at an altitude which ranges between 1,900 metres to 2,300 metres, is characterized by herbaceous plants and shrubs most notable amongst them is the juniper and willow. Moreover, the most important plants of this floor include the alpine bluegrass, alpine aster, trefoil and common bird's-foot trefoil.

Fauna
Only 20 species of mammals has been recorded within the park's land area. Additionally, large mammals such as brown bear, roe deer, chamois as well as rare or endangered species like the gray wolf, lynx, and wild goat inhabit the park. 50 species of birds have been observed, with raptors such as the golden eagle, lesser kestrel, nuthatch, robin, blackbird, red-backed shrike, western capercaillie and rock partridge. Due to the harsh winters, the park has few reptile and amphibian species. A total of 10 species of reptiles and 8 species of amphibia reside in park including the alpine salamander, common frog, alpine newt and brown trout.

Gallery

See also 

 Geography of Albania
 Protected areas of Albania 
 Albanian Alps

References 

 
 

National parks of Albania
Tourist attractions in Albania
Geography of Shkodër County
Tourist attractions in Shkodër County
Important Bird Areas of Albania
Protected areas established in 1966
1966 establishments in Albania
Forests of Albania